The 2017 Bahamas Bowl was a college football bowl game played on December 22, 2017, at Thomas Robinson Stadium in Nassau in the Bahamas.  The fourth annual Bahamas Bowl, it was one of the 2017–18 bowl games concluding the 2017 FBS football season. It began at 12:30 PM EST and aired on ESPN.

The game featured the Ohio Bobcats of the Mid-American Conference against the UAB Blazers of Conference USA.  Ohio beat UAB by a score of 41–6.

Teams
The game featured the UAB Blazers against the Ohio Bobcats and was the first-ever meeting between the two schools.

UAB Blazers

2017 was the Blazers' first season back on the football field following a two-year hiatus (the program had originally been dropped, but massive public outcry led to its reinstatement a year later).  After finishing their regular season 8–4, the Blazers accepted their invitation to the Bahamas Bowl.

This was the first bowl game for UAB since the 2004 Hawaii Bowl where they lost to the Hawaii Warriors by a score of 59–40.

Ohio Bobcats

After finishing their regular season 8–4, the Bobcats accepted their invitation to the Bahamas Bowl.

This was Ohio's eighth bowl appearance in the last nine seasons, and their first appearance in the Bahamas Bowl.

Game summary

Scoring Summary

Statistics

References

External links
Box score at ESPN

2017–18 NCAA football bowl games
2017
2017
2017
December 2017 sports events in North America
2017 in Bahamian sport